The Furness Railway 120 class (classified K1 by Bob Rush) or "Seagulls", were a class of four 4-4-0 steam locomotives designed by W. F. Pettigrew and built by Sharp Stewart and Company of Glasgow for the Furness Railway in 1890.

Transfer to LMS
They all passed to the London, Midland and Scottish Railway at the 1923 grouping.

Disposal
They were withdrawn between 1924 and 1927.

See also 
Locomotives of the Furness Railway

References

K1
4-4-0 locomotives
Sharp Stewart locomotives
Railway locomotives introduced in 1890
Scrapped locomotives
Standard gauge steam locomotives of Great Britain